Daniel Adade (born 4 April 1995) is a professional soccer player who plays as a striker in East Timorese football since 2016.

Club career

Early career
Born on 4 April 1995, in the city of Accra, Ghana, Daniel Adade started playing football on the Saturn FC team, where in 2007 and 2008 he played in the second division.

In 2008, he left Saturn and went to play the second division for Accra Ranger, where he remained until 2010. In 2010, he signed a contract with Istanbul FC, where he stayed until 2014, when he was loaned to Bochum Linden.

Dreams FC

In 2016, Adade signed a contract with Dreams F.C. and debuted in the Ghana Premier League (first division of Ghana).

East Timor

In 2016, Adade left the African continent and went to venture into Southeast Asia.

The first Timorese club in which Adade served was FC Zebra from the city of Baucau, and also played for Karketu Dili, where he had a quick passage between 2016 and 2017. In 2018 he returned to his country to defend the colors of Dreams F.C. (Ghana), with whom he still had contractual ties.

He returned to Timor to compete for the Liga Futebol Amadora by the Assalam FC team. His style of playing and scoring goals drew the attention of the other Timorese teams.

His style of playing and scoring goals helped the Assalam FC to win the 2018 LFA Segunda title and get promoted to Liga Futebol Amadora Primeira Divisão.

In 2020, he joined Lalenok United to compete as the club sought to bolster their squad ahead of their 2020 AFC Cup campaign.

International career 
In 2015, he was shortlisted to play for his country's national team in the under-20 world cup in New Zealand, but ended up suffering an injury and was cut.

References

1995 births
Living people
East Timorese footballers
Ghanaian footballers
Ghana international footballers
Association football forwards